Elizabeth Frances Dagley (1788–1853), sometimes publishing under her initials as E.F.D., was a Regency Era author of children's literature. She was the daughter of the artist and educator Richard Dagley. Her writing, although for children, "articulates the problems and misery of economic insecurity".

Bibliography
 Fairy Favours, and other tales. 1825.
 The Birthday, and other tales. 1828.
 The Village Nightingale: with other tales. 1829.
 The Young Seer or, Early Searches into Futurity. 1834.

References

1788 births
1853 deaths
19th-century English writers